Nathalie Mari Hagman (born 19 July 1991) is a Swedish handball player for Neptunes de Nantes and the Swedish national handball team.

She played her first match for Sweden in 2009 at the age of 17. To date, Hagman is still the youngest ever debutant in the national team.

Honours

International
EHF Champions League:
Bronze Medalist: 2018
EHF Cup Winners' Cup:
Winner: 2016
EHF European League:
Winner: 2015
Winner: 2021
European Championship:
Silver Medalist: 2010
Bronze Medalist: 2014
Carpathian Trophy:
Winner: 2015

Individual
 Junior World Championship Top Scorer: 2010
 Swedish Elitserien Young Player of the Season: 2009
 Swedish Elitserien Top Scorer: 2011, 2012, 2014
 EHF Cup Top Scorer: 2015
 EHF Cup Winners' Cup Top Scorer: 2016
 IHF World Women's Handball Championship Top scorer: 2021
 Danish League Player of the Season: 2016
 Danish League Best Right Wing: 2016
 Danish League Best Right Back: 2017
 Swedish Female Handballer of the Year: 2016
 All Star Right Wing of the Summer Olympics: 2016
 All Star Right Wing of the World Championship: 2017

Personal life
Hagman's twin sister, Gabrielle, is also a handball player. She is openly lesbian.

References

External links

1991 births
Living people
Swedish female handball players
Expatriate handball players
Swedish expatriate sportspeople in Denmark
Swedish expatriate sportspeople in France
Swedish expatriate sportspeople in Romania
Handball players at the 2016 Summer Olympics
Olympic handball players of Sweden
Lugi HF players
TTH Holstebro players
Twin sportspeople
Handball players at the 2020 Summer Olympics

Swedish LGBT sportspeople
21st-century Swedish women